The 1990–91 season was the 99th season in Liverpool F.C.'s existence, and their 29th consecutive year in the top flight. The season saw the club unable to defend its league title and did not reclaim the title for another thirty years until the 2019–20 season. 

Manager Kenny Dalglish resigned on 22 February 1991 following a dramatic 4–4 draw with local rivals Everton, citing personal reasons for his decision. With caretaker Ronnie Moran in charge, Liverpool failed to regain the lead of the First Division from Arsenal, who finished as champions having lost just one game all season. However, the club was still able to secure another top-two finish for a record 10th season in succession. Graeme Souness was appointed manager on 16 April for the five last matches of the season, resulting in three wins and two defeats.

Captain Alan Hansen, out of action for a nearly a year, announced his retirement as a player not long after Dalglish's resignation.

The season had started very well for the Reds, who as defending league champions won their first eight league games, including a 4–0 victory over Manchester United at Anfield, and enjoyed a 15-match unbeaten start in the league.

It was also the final season at Anfield for striker Peter Beardsley, who enjoyed a fine start to his fourth season at the club but was then dropped in favour of new signing David Speedie halfway through the season. Both players left the club in the close season; Speedie to Blackburn Rovers and Beardsley to local rivals Everton. Also on their way out of Anfield that summer were defenders Gary Gillespie and Steve Staunton to Celtic and Aston Villa respectively. The close season saw Liverpool pay a national record £2.9million for Derby County striker Dean Saunders, who had been one of the First Division's top scorers in 1990–91 despite his team being relegated in bottom place. A further £2.5million went to the East Midlanders for England defender Mark Wright. An outlay of £1.25million also went on midfielder Mark Walters, who followed Souness to Anfield from Rangers.

Just weeks before his resignation, Dalglish invested for the future with a move for 17-year-old AFC Bournemouth midfielder Jamie Redknapp, while fellow teenage midfielder Steve McManaman made his first two senior appearances during the season. He also gave a senior debut to 18-year-old winger Steve McManaman just before Christmas.

Events of the season

August
Liverpool's defence of their record 18th top division league title began on 25 August 1990 at Bramall Lane, where they defeated newly promoted Sheffield United 3–1. A visit to Wembley a week earlier for the FA Charity Shield had seen Liverpool share the honour with FA Cup holders Manchester United in a 1–1 draw.

September
September ended with Liverpool top of the First Division, having won all of their seven opening league games, including a 3–2 win at Goodison Park in the Merseyside derby in which Peter Beardsley scored twice, and even more impressively a 4–0 demolition of Manchester United at Anfield in which Beardsley hit a hat-trick. Beardsley ended the month as the First Division's top goalscorer with seven goals in as many games.

October
Liverpool's winning start to the season reached an eighth successive game as they triumphed 2–0 at home to struggling Derby County, and in the next game they dropped points for the first time when Norwich City held them to a 1–1 draw at Carrow Road. The month ended in disappointment when Manchester United dumped them out of the Football League Cup with a 3–1 defeat at Old Trafford.

November
Peter Beardsley's excellent form continued as he reached the 10-goal mark in the First Division on 10 November, finding the net in a 4–0 home win over Luton Town. It was also a fine month for Ian Rush, who was on the scoresheet twice against both Luton Town and Tottenham Hotspur. Liverpool remained comfortably in the lead at the top of the First Division as November ended.

December
Liverpool's unbeaten start to the season ended after 14 games when they crashed 3–0 to their nearest challengers Arsenal at Highbury on 2 December, but their lead of the First Division remained intact. The month ended with a second defeat at Crystal Palace, slowly emerging as outsiders in the title race, but also included wins over Sheffield United and Southampton.

January
The new year brought two significant signings for Liverpool, in the shape of experienced striker David Speedie from Coventry City and promising 17-year-old midfielder Jamie Redknapp from AFC Bournemouth. There were just three league games for the Reds this month, starting with a 3–0 win over Leeds United at Anfield on New Year's Day, followed by draws against Aston Villa at Wimbledon.

The FA Cup quest got off to a rocky start, with the Reds needing replays to see off Second Division competition in the shape of Blackburn Rovers in the third round and Brighton & Hove Albion in the fourth. However, Arsenal had overtaken the Reds as league leaders by the end of the month.

February
Kenny Dalglish stunned the football world on 22 February 1991 by suddenly announcing his resignation as Liverpool manager after nearly six years in charge, during which time he had guided them to three league titles, two FA Cups, and they had never finished lower than runners-up in the league. They were also in contention for the double when he handed in his resignation, having just forced a second replay against Everton in the fifth round following a goalless draw at Anfield and a 4–4 thriller at Goodison Park less than 48 hours before the bombshell was dropped. They had also beaten Everton in the league earlier in the month.

Long-serving coach Ronnie Moran was put in temporary charge of the first team until a permanent successor could be found. However, the month ended with Everton finally getting the better of the Reds in the second replay of the FA Cup fifth round.

March
Arsenal extended their lead over the Reds with a 1–0 win at Anfield on 3 March, but wins in the next three games (including a 7–1 demolition of bottom club Derby County at The Baseball Ground)kept the Reds in contention for a 19th league title.

April
13 goals and three straight wins meant that Liverpool ended the month still capable of catching Arsenal in the race for the league title, giving new manager Graeme Souness every chance of a dream return to the club he served so well as a player.

May
Successive defeats to Chelsea and Nottingham Forest ended Liverpool's hopes of another league title as the championship trophy headed back to Arsenal, who had seized it from Liverpool's grasp with the last kick of the season two years earlier. The last league action of the season was a 2–0 home win over Tottenham Hotspur, and the Reds at least had the consolation of a record 10th successive top two finish.

Much speculation surrounded Anfield at the end of the season regarding who would be joining Liverpool and who might be leaving. The future of Peter Beardsley at Anfield was looking particularly bleak; after an excellent start to the season which saw him hit the back of the net 11 times in the league before the end of November, he had struggled to hold down his place in the first team due to competition from Ronny Rosenthal and then David Speedie for the position as Ian Rush's strike partner. There was also talk that David Speedie could soon be on his way out of Anfield just months after arriving as Souness looked to sign a new striker, with Mo Johnston of Rangers and Dean Saunders of Derby County being two names most strongly linked with a move to Anfield. Following the retirement of Alan Hansen in the centre of defence, Derby County's Mark Wright also became a transfer target. Midfielder Craig Johnston, who had announced his retirement from playing three years earlier in order to care for his sister following a serious accident, was offered the chance of reviving his career by Souness.

Squad

Goalkeepers
  Bruce Grobbelaar
  Mike Hooper
  Robbie Holcroft

Defenders
  Gary Ablett
  David Burrows
  Gary Gillespie
  Alex Watson
  Glenn Hysén
  Steve Nicol
  Steve Staunton
  Barry Venison
  Nick Tanner

Midfielders
  Don Hutchison
  Steve McMahon
  Steve McManaman
  Ronnie Whelan
  John Barnes
  Ray Houghton
  Mike Marsh
  Jan Mølby
  Jamie Redknapp
  Jimmy Carter
  Jim Magilton

Attackers
  Peter Beardsley
  Ian Rush
  David Speedie
  Ronnie Rosenthal
  Tony Cousins
  John Barnes

First Division

League table

Matches

FA Charity Shield

First Division

FA Cup

Football League Cup

Top scorers
  Ian Rush 16
  John Barnes 16
  Peter Beardsley 11
  Jan Mølby 9
  Ray Houghton 7
  David Speedie 6
  Ronnie Rosenthal 5

Recap

References 

Liverpool F.C. seasons
Liverpool